Banská Bystrica District is a district in the Banská Bystrica Region of central Slovakia. Until 1918, the area belonged to the county of Zvolen within the Kingdom of Hungary.

Municipalities

References 

Districts of Slovakia
Geography of Banská Bystrica Region